Scott Taylor (born 27 February 1991) is an English rugby league footballer who plays as a  for Hull F.C. in the Betfred Super League, and the England Knights and England at international level.

He has previously played for Hull Kingston Rovers and the Wigan Warriors, spending a season on loan from Wigan at the Salford Red Devils in the Super League.

Background
Taylor was born in Kingston upon Hull, East Riding of Yorkshire, England.

Playing career

Hull Kingston Rovers
Taylor made his Hull Kingston Rovers début against Leeds in the 2009 Super League play-offs. On 6 June 2011, he signed a new two-year contract with Rovers, ending rumours linking him with a move to Huddersfield or Hull F.C.

Wigan
On 16 October 2012, Taylor signed a two-year contract, with the option for a third year, with Wigan for a "substantial settlement fee".

2013 proved a very successful year in Taylor's career.  On 24 August, he would start the 2013 Challenge Cup final from interchange, winning the game 16–0 against his boyhood club Hull F.C. at Wembley Stadium.

On 5 October, Taylor started on the bench in Wigan's Super League Grand Final victory over Warrington. Taylor won Wigan a penalty sidestepping before getting caught high by Carvell, Wigan gained important field position from this after previously conceding a barrage of points, thereafter they scored 28 unanswered points to win the game 30–16 at Old Trafford.

He played 2 games for Leigh Centurions (Heritage № 1379) on loan in 2013.

Salford
In November 2014, Taylor was loaned to Salford after Wigan activated the optional 3rd year of his contract.

Hull
Taylor left Wigan, and returned to his hometown of Hull to play for his boyhood club of Hull F.C. in 2016.

On 27 August 2016, Taylor played in Hull's 12-10 Challenge Cup final win over Warrington, the first time that Hull had won the trophy at Wembley Stadium after eight previous attempts.

Due to his success in 2016, he was included in the Super League Dream Team.

On 26 August 2017, Taylor once again won the Challenge Cup with Hull in an 18–14 win over Wigan at Wembley Stadium.

He played 11 games for Hull F.C. in the 2020 Super League season including the club's semi-final defeat against Wigan.

International
In October 2016, Taylor was selected in England's 24-man squad for the 2016 Four Nations. He made his international début in a test match against France.

In October 2017 he was selected in the England squad for the 2017 Rugby League World Cup.

On 24 June 2018, Taylor came off the bench in England's victory over New Zealand, which was played at Mile High Stadium, the home ground of Taylor's favourite NFL side, Denver Broncos.

Honours

Wigan
Super League Grand Final: (1) 2013
Challenge Cup: (1) 2013

Hull FC
Challenge Cup: (2) 2016, 2017

Individual
Super League Dream Team: (1) 2016

References

External links

Hull FC profile
SL profile
Statistics at rlwc2017.com

1991 births
Living people
England Knights national rugby league team players
England national rugby league team players
English rugby league players
Hull F.C. players
Hull Kingston Rovers players
Leigh Leopards players
Rugby league players from Kingston upon Hull
Rugby league props
Rugby league second-rows
Salford Red Devils players
Wigan Warriors players